Thirty-Eighth Army or 38th Army may refer to:

 38th Army (People's Republic of China)
 Thirty-Eighth Army (Japan), an army of the Imperial Japanese Army
 38th Army (Soviet Union), a field army of the Soviet Union